John Mulholland may refer to:

John Mulholland, 1st Baron Dunleath (1819–1895), Irish businessman and Conservative member of parliament
John F. Mulholland Jr., United States Army officer
John Mulholland (footballer, born 1928) (1928–2015), Scottish footballer (Grimsby Town, Scunthorpe United)
John Mulholland (footballer, born 1932) (1932–2000), Scottish footballer (Chester FC, Halifax Town)
John Mulholland (Irish republican), president of the Irish Republican Brotherhood, 1910–1912
John Mulholland (journalist) (born 1962), editor of The Guardian US
John Mulholland (director), American writer and director
John Mulholland (magician) (1898–1970), American magician
John Mulholland (politician) (1946–2022), Irish politician, mayor of Galway 1986–1987 and 1996–1997
John Henry Mulholland, Liberal candidate in the 1962 Stockton-on-Tees by-election and father of Greg Mulholland MP